Birju Shah (died 4 September 2022) was an Indian International boxer who won silver and bronze medals for India in the Asian Games and Commonwealth Games in 1994-95, and medals in National Games.

Biography
Birju Shah was born at Jamshedpur, Bihar (now Jharkhand), India.

Birju Shah represented India as a boxer and had won many Gold, Silver and Bronze medals for India in Asian, commonwealth games and international championships. He won Bronze medal in Junior Asian Championships in 1993. Birju won Bronze medals in both Asian Games and Commonwealth Games in 1994. Birju became the country's first boxer to won medals in both Asian Games and Commonwealth  Games. He also won Gold medal in YMCA International Championship in 1996 and Bronze medal in International Invitational Championship in 1994 and 1998. 

He had also won many medals in national level games played in the country. He won Gold (1993 and 1994), Silver (1999) and Bronze (1997) in National Games and also won Gold medal in national championship in 1995,1996 and 1998. He had also won Bronze medal in East India Open Championship in 2000.

Death 
Birju Shah died on 4 September 2022 at the age of 50 years, at Jamshedpur, Jharkhand. He was suffering from Blood Pressure, Diabetes and liver related disease.

References

1970s births
2022 deaths
Year of birth missing
Indian male boxers
Light-flyweight boxers
Asian Games competitors for India
Commonwealth Games competitors for India
Boxers from Jharkhand
People from Jamshedpur
Asian Games medalists in boxing
Boxers at the 1994 Asian Games
Medalists at the 1994 Asian Games
Asian Games bronze medalists for India
Commonwealth Games bronze medallists for India
Commonwealth Games medallists in boxing
Boxers at the 1994 Commonwealth Games
Medallists at the 1994 Commonwealth Games